Dujic may refer to:

 Dujić, a South Slavic surname
 Đujić, a South Slavic surname